Roger Victor Solo Rakotondrajao (26 March 1960 – 3 November 2018) was a Malagasy Roman Catholic bishop.

Biography 
Rakotondrajao was born in Madagascar and was ordained to the priesthood in 1990. He served as coadjutor bishop of the Roman Catholic Diocese of Mahajanga, Madagascar, from 2008 to 2010 and then bishop of that Diocese from 2010 until his death in 2018.

Notes

1960 births
2018 deaths
21st-century Roman Catholic bishops in Madagascar
Malagasy Roman Catholic bishops
Roman Catholic bishops of Mahajanga